The 1956 Six Hour Le Mans was an endurance motor race for Closed Production Cars and Sports Cars. The event was held at the Caversham Airfield in Western Australia on 20 May 1956, utilizing the "Triangle" circuit. It was the second Six Hour Le Mans race to be held in Western Australia. The race was scheduled to be run on 13 May but was postponed until 20 May.

The race was won by Sydney Anderson and Sid Taylor driving an Austin-Healey 100.

Results

The above results are incomplete.

The Teams Prize was awarded to the Diesel Motors Renault Team which comprised cars No 2 and the No 3 competing in the under 750cc class.

Notes & references

Six Hours Le Mans
Six Hour Le Mans
May 1956 sports events in Australia